Cora Louise Evans (1904 – March 30, 1957) was an American wife and mother who was raised Mormon and eventually went on to convert to Catholicism in 1935. She is considered to be a Catholic mystic.

Evans was a member of the Church of Jesus Christ of Latter-day Saints but became disillusioned with the church and was baptized into the Catholic Church in 1935 in Utah.

She later said she received visions of Jesus and Mary, which she promoted as "The Mystical Humanity of Christ." Her cause for sainthood has been approved by the Holy See, gaining her the title Servant of God, and her cause is being handled by the Diocese of Monterey in California.

Cause of Beatification and Canonization 
In June 2010, the cause of beatification and canonization was officially opened. Twelve years later, in the fall of 2022, the United States Conference of Catholic Bishops voted to advance the cause to the diocesan level.

References

Roman Catholic mystics
Former Latter Day Saints
Visions of Jesus and Mary
American Roman Catholics
People from Midvale, Utah
Converts to Roman Catholicism
American Servants of God
1904 births
1957 deaths
20th-century Christian mystics
American Christian mystics